Thomas McFarlane (born 1872) was a Scottish footballer who played at full-back for Hibernian, Burslem Port Vale and Middlesbrough in the 1890s and 1900s.

Career
McFarlane joined Burslem Port Vale in November 1898, and made his debut at the Athletic Ground in a 2–0 defeat by Leicester Fosse on 12 November. He became a regular in the side and made 22 Second Division and five cup appearances in the 1898–99 season. He played 31 league and 10 cup games in the 1899–1900 campaign, before he departed for league rivals Middlesbrough in the summer.

Career statistics
Source:

References

1872 births
Date of birth missing
Year of death missing
Association football fullbacks
Scottish footballers
Hibernian F.C. players
Port Vale F.C. players
Middlesbrough F.C. players
Scottish Football League players
Scottish Football League representative players
English Football League players